Stadion Miejski (Kraków) may refer to various stadiums in Kraków, Poland
 Stadion Miejski Cracovii (Kraków)
 Stadion Miejski Hutnika (Kraków)
 Stadion Miejski Wisły (Kraków)